The Foundation for Student Life in Oslo and Akershus (SiO) is a student welfare organisation in Oslo, Norway. It was known as the Foundation for Student Life in Oslo until January 2011, when it expanded into Akershus.

It was established in 1939 as the first of its kind in Norway. It among others serves students of the University of Oslo, the Oslo School of Architecture and Design, the MF Norwegian School of Theology, the Norwegian School of Sport Sciences, the Norwegian School of Veterinary Science, the Norwegian Academy of Music, BI Norwegian Business School and the Oslo National Academy of the Arts.

References

Student organizations established in 1939
Companies based in Oslo
Oslo
Real estate companies of Norway
Retail companies of Norway
University of Oslo
Oslo School of Architecture and Design
MF Norwegian School of Theology, Religion and Society
Norwegian School of Sport Sciences
Norwegian School of Veterinary Science
Norwegian Academy of Music
BI Norwegian Business School
Oslo National Academy of the Arts
1939 establishments in Norway